Femicide is the murder of a woman motivated by gender. Femicide is perpetrated by a figure that the victim knows in a vast majority of cases. Between 2016 and 2017, 64% of femicide cases in Ecuador were committed by a former member of the household and 25% were committed by a current member of the household. Between 2007 and 2012, the 25 countries with the most femicides make up more than half of femicide victims, and of these 25 countries, 14 are either in Latin America or in the Caribbean.  Throughout the 2010s, femicide began to be legally recognized by different Latin American governments; Mexico recognized it in 2012, Chile in 2010, Ecuador in 2015, and more. As a result, governments have been able to better keep track of femicide statistics and begin to take the steps to address the causes of the issue and policy solutions. In 2019, Brazil and Mexico saw the most femicides per 100,000 women, an increase from previous years for both countries.

Awareness for this issue in Latin America has increased with films like the "Three Deaths of Marisela Escobedo", which tells the story of Marisela Escobedo Ortiz and her fight to hold the perpetrator accountable for the femicide of her daughter, and "Feminicido en Latino America", which explores the effects that this issue has in the countries they look at. There have also been protests throughout Latin America calling to address this issue, the most recently prominent being the March 2020 protests in Mexico. Pink crosses are used to commemorate victims of femicide throughout Latin America.

Mexico 

Marcela Lagarde, an author and anthropologist, makes the distinction between "femicidio" and "feminicidio", two culminations of the term femicide as described by Diana Russell. The former is described as a translation of femicide as defined by Russell and the latter described the social and legal systems that perpetuate femicides (e.g., misogynist judges, poor application of the law, and anti-feminist politicians). Dr. Julia Monarrez Fragoso describes on aspect of how systems impact femicide in her analysis of femicides in Ciudad Juarez between 1993 and 2005. The data that her analysis is constructed on lacks preciseness in the exact number of women killed and the motivations behind their murders. The first reliably documented case of femicide in Mexico goes back to January 1993, with the murder of Alma Chavira Farel.

Ciudad Juarez, Chihuahua 

Femicide in Ciudad Juarez has promulgated femicide into Mexican political discussion since 1993. Of the 442 homicides against women that occurred between 1993 and 2005, a majority of the victims were between the age of 10 and 29 (54.1%). Additionally, 26.5% of these victims were below the age of 18. 1995 saw the most homicides throughout this time with 49 women killed. Of the 442 women killed, 301 have been femicides, where 126 were committed by an intimate partner, 150 were committed by men who clearly used misogyny or sexism and sexually or physically abused the victim, and 25 were killed doing a "stigmatized" occupation like sex work.

Of the women that died to an intimate partner, 22 of the perpetrators committed the femicide out of jealousy and 17 committed femicide during an argument. However, 24 of the intimate partner cases have no conclusive evidence for cause. In the cases where a minor was murdered, 8 of the victims showed signs of abuse, 5 were killed for crying, and 5 victims had no conclusive motivation behind the murder. Of the 25 women who were killed doing a stigmatized occupation, 5 victims were killed because of relationship problems, 4 were killed so the perpetrator could avoid paying, and 11 were killed with no conclusive motivation. Out of 38 systemic femicides, 5 victims were killed out of jealousy, 5 were killed while intoxicated, and 20 show no conclusive motivation.

Femicide after being legally distinguished in Mexico 
Femicide was distinguished as its own crime under federal Mexican law on June 14, 2012. It would not be until 2015, three years after femicide was distinguished under Mexican Penal Code, that the Mexican Supreme Court would establish that each violent murder of a woman would be investigated  as a femicide, until there is evidence to show otherwise. Between 2012 and 2017, there were 12,796 homicide victims that were female. However, only 22% of the investigations around these crimes began with the suspicion of femicide. 70% of the victims were murdered in a public sphere. Around 40% of these cases had victims between the ages of 21 and 30. According to ONU Mujeres, case numbers decreased from 2012 to 2015 and increased from 2015 to 2017. In fact, according to the "Secretariado Ejecutivo del Sistema Nacional de Seguridad Pública" (SESNSP, translates to "Executive Secretariat of the National Public Security System"), both femicides and the homicide against women has been increasing since 2015. Since the start of 2021 to May 2021, femicide cases rose by 7.1%, which makes up for 423 women.

Brazil 

Femicide in Brazil was recognized in 2015 after legislation was passed to increase women's protections and provide harsher punishments for perpetrators. At that time, femicide rates were the fifth highest in the world and 15 women were being murdered daily. Between 2018 and 2020, femicide numbers rose from 1,229 to 1,330 to 1,350, maintaining a proportion of 1.2 women out of 100,000 murdered on average. In Brazil, women of color are disproportionately affected by gendered crimes; Balanço Ligue 180 statistics show that 60% of women that are victims of violence are black. The percentage increases to 68.8% when looking at the rates of homicides against women. Further, the Mapa de Violencia showed that femicide rates among white women fell from 2003 to 2013 and increased for black women in this same period.

Other countries

References 

Wikipedia Student Program
Femicide
Gender in Latin America